Lake Church is an unincorporated community located in the town of Belgium, Ozaukee County, Wisconsin, United States. Lake Church is east of Belgium and is near Interstate 43.

History
A post office called Lake Church was established in 1894; it closed in 1907. The community took its name from St. Mary's of the Lake Church.

References

Unincorporated communities in Ozaukee County, Wisconsin
Unincorporated communities in Wisconsin